Montegut is a census-designated place (CDP) in Terrebonne Parish, Louisiana, United States. The population was 1,540 at the 2010 census. It is part of the Houma–Bayou Cane–Thibodaux metropolitan statistical area. It was the primary filming location for the 2012 film Beasts of the Southern Wild.

History
The community developed around a sugar mill founded in 1883.  Montegut got its name when a post office was opened in 1885, named after Gabriel Montegut, a prominent resident of Houma, by Congressman Edward James Gay.

The 1941 WPA guide to Louisiana reported an elevation of 8 feet and population of 200.

Geography
Montegut is located at  (29.473700, -90.555381).

According to the United States Census Bureau, the CDP has a total area of 4.5 square miles (11.8 km), of which 4.5 square miles (11.6 km) is land and 0.1 square mile (0.2 km) (1.54%) is water.

Demographics

As of the 2020 United States census, there were 1,465 people, 594 households, and 443 families residing in the CDP.

Education
Terrebonne Parish School District operates public schools. Montegut Elementary School and Montegut Middle School is in the community.

In popular culture
The 2012 film Beasts of the Southern Wild was filmed in Montegut.  Director Benh Zeitlin and his crew worked out of an abandoned gas station in town. They built the film's fictional settlement—the "Bathtub"—by hand with found artifacts and rusted-out equipment from the surrounding area.  The film was nominated for four Academy Awards.

References

External links

Montegut's daily newspaper -- Houmatoday.com
 Pitre history in Montegut <--Broken link May 2015.

Census-designated places in Louisiana
Census-designated places in Terrebonne Parish, Louisiana
Census-designated places in Houma – Thibodaux metropolitan area